"Graffiti" is the fortieth single of Japanese solo artist Gackt, released on November 30, 2011. It's the third opening song of the anime Sket Dance.

Summary 
Gackt announced that he will continue his collaboration with the anime Sket Dance in November. Dante, the vocalist of a band named JardiN, was modeled after Gackt, and he himself voiced the character. He also sang the song "Iki Toshi Ikeru Subete ni Tsugu", which Dante performs in the story.

The music video was filmed in the late-night streets of Shibuya, Tokyo. In the beginning, it features Gackt in the limousine and as he gets off the car as a camera guy follows him through the streets. It ends with him going to the parking area, and riding off on a horse he used in the NHK drama Fūrin Kazan and regularly uses at Joetsu city's Great Kenshin Festival.

Track listings and formats

Charts 

Oricon

Billboard Japan

References

2011 singles
Gackt songs
Animated series theme songs
Songs with lyrics by Shoko Fujibayashi